Marianne Lienau (19 December 1935 – 24 April 2021) was a German presenter, radio journalist and contributing editor.

Life
Lienau was born in 1935 and she is known for the WDR 3 radio series  (Critical Diary), which she and Hanno Reuther founded on 3 April 1967. She moderated the programme for many years. The programme ran from for 35 years from 1967 to 2003.

Lienau was also involved in the WDR series Neugier genügt. From 1989 to 1994 she moved to Mario Nordio in Rome as a radio correspondent for WDR and NDR. At her own request, she retired in 1997.

Lienau died on 24 April 2021, aged 85.

References

German editors
German journalists
German women
1935 births
2021 deaths
Place of birth missing
Place of death missing
Mass media people from Königsberg